There are 250 active stations of the Moscow Metro. Of these, 209 on Moscow Metro proper, and some additional ones that are marketed by Moscow Metro: 6 stations of Moscow Monorail and 31 stations of the Moscow Central Circle. Two stations have been closed. 

As of 2017 several new stations are under construction or being planned. One station is reserved for future service (Delovoy Tsentr for the Bolshaya Koltsevaya line).

By number of stations the Moscow Metro is ranked 8th, cf. List of metro systems. The deepest station of Moscow Metro, Park Pobedy, is the third-deepest metro station of the world.

Active stations

Physical characteristics
Of the Moscow Metro's 229 stations, 78 are deep underground, 109 are shallow, and 42 (25 of them on the Central Circle) are at or above ground level. Of the latter there are 12 ground-level stations, four elevated stations, and one station (Vorobyovy Gory) on a bridge.

The deep stations comprise 55 triple-vaulted pylon stations, 19 triple-vaulted column stations, and one single-vault station. 

The shallow stations comprise 72 spanned column stations (a large portion of them following the "centipede" design), 33 single-vaulted stations (Kharkov technology), and three single-spanned stations. 

Two stations have three tracks, and one has double halls. Seven of the stations have side platforms (only one of which is subterranean). In addition, there were two temporary stations within rail yards.

Gallery of station types

Key to transfer details

List

Expansion dynamics

Notes 
 A.  All ridership statistics are daily average passengers for 2007.

References
General

Depth and type

External links

UrbanRail.Net
 KartaMetro.info: lines, stations, and exits on Moscow map and satellite imagery; public transportation near metro stations

Metro.ru : information, history, maps, art
 MetroWalks Moscow: photos of all metro stations
 Metro.Molot.ru : lines, stations, plans, articles
 Моё Метро ("My Metro"): stations, cars, links
 yapriedu.ru/metro/: interactive scheme of the system

Moscow Metro
Moscow
Metro stations